Abílio Rodas de Sousa Ribas C.S.Sp. He served as the Bishop of the Diocese of São Tomé and Príncipe from 1984 until his retirement in 2006.

See also
Catholic Church in São Tomé and Príncipe

References

Living people
1931 births
São Tomé and Príncipe Roman Catholic bishops
São Tomé and Príncipe Roman Catholics
21st-century Roman Catholic bishops in São Tomé and Príncipe
20th-century Roman Catholic bishops in São Tomé and Príncipe
Portuguese emigrants to São Tomé and Príncipe
People from Arcos de Valdevez
Roman Catholic bishops of São Tomé and Príncipe
Holy Ghost Fathers